Benjamin Mount, also known as Verse, Ben the Verse, The Verse and Pendulum Man, is an English rapper, MC, record producer and record label owner best known as the former MC in Australian/British drum and bass group Pendulum.

Biography

Pendulum 

Since 2006 and up until 2012 Ben has been the MC for Pendulum's Live Tours, remained their MC at DJ set events until mid 2017. In 2010, he made his studio debut on the band's album Immersion as the vocals to the song "The Vulture".

Ben left the Pendulum Live shows to focus on creating his own songs and running his own label. As of late 2017 he has also ceased to appear on DJ sets.

Producer 
Verse is also a known drum and bass and dubstep producer. He had several drum and bass releases on his own label Crunch Recordings alongside other artists such as SP:MC, dBridge and others.
He also has several releases on N-Type's dubstep-label Wheel&Deal.

References

External links

English male rappers
Living people
1977 births
Pendulum (drum and bass band) members
Rappers from London